Missy Kane (born June 21, 1955) is an American middle-distance runner. She competed in the women's 1500 metres at the 1984 Summer Olympics.

References

External links
 

1955 births
Living people
Athletes (track and field) at the 1983 Pan American Games
Athletes (track and field) at the 1984 Summer Olympics
American female middle-distance runners
Olympic track and field athletes of the United States
Sportspeople from Nashville, Tennessee
Pan American Games medalists in athletics (track and field)
Pan American Games bronze medalists for the United States
Medalists at the 1983 Pan American Games
20th-century American women